Terry Tim Kunz (born October 26, 1952) is a former American football running back who played one season with the Oakland Raiders of the National Football League (NFL). He was drafted by the Oakland Raiders in the eighth round of the 1976 NFL Draft. Kunz played college football at the University of Colorado Boulder and attended Wheat Ridge High School in Wheat Ridge, Colorado. He was a member of the Oakland Raiders team that won Super Bowl XI. His daughter Annie Kunz is a member of Team USA Track and Field as part of the 2020 USA Olympic Team.

References

External links
Just Sports Stats
Fanbase profile

Living people
1952 births
Players of American football from Denver
American football running backs
Colorado Buffaloes football players
Oakland Raiders players